Arhopala japonica, the Japanese oakblue, is a butterfly of the family Lycaenidae. It is found in Indochina, Japan, the Ryukyu Islands, the Korean Peninsula and Taiwan.

The wingspan is 24–30 mm.

The larvae feed on Pasania edulis, Pasania glabra, Quercus acuta, Quercus glauca, Quercus serrata, Quercus stenophylla, Cyclobalanopsis glauca, Cyclobalanopsis gilva and Cyclobalanopsis acuta.

Subspecies
 Arhopala japonica japonica
 Arhopala japonica kotoshona (Taiwan)

References

Arhopala
Butterflies of Indochina
Butterflies described in 1875
Butterflies of Asia
Taxa named by Richard Paget Murray